Coverdale may refer to:

Places
Coverdale (dale), one of the Yorkshire Dales, England
Coverdale Parish, New Brunswick, Canada
Coverdale, New Brunswick, Canada
Coverdale, a former name of Riverview, New Brunswick, Canada
Lower Coverdale, New Brunswick, Canada
Coverdale, Louisiana

People
Bill Coverdale (1912–1972), English cricketer
Bob Coverdale (b.1928), English rugby league player
Charles Harry Coverdale (1888–1955), English soldier
Christine Coverdale, American physicist
David Coverdale (b.1951), English rock singer
Drew Coverdale (b.1969), English footballer
Garrison B. Coverdale (1905–1988), US Army general
John Coverdale, New Zealand-American academic psychiatrist
Kevin Coverdale (1940-1997) Australian rules footballer
Linda Coverdale, American translator
Myles Coverdale (c.1488–1569), English Bible translator and bishop
Paul Coverdale (b.1983), English cricketer
Ralph Coverdale (1918–1975), British management consultant
Stephen Coverdale (b.1954), English cricketer
William Coverdale (1862–1935), English cricketer
William Coverdale (1801–1865), Canadian architect

Other
CFS Coverdale, military station in Canada
Coverdale House Publishers, British Christian publishing company